Sar Saran (also Romanized as Sar Sārān; also known as Sar Sārūn, Sar-e Sālārān, and Sar-i-Sahrah) is a village in Pishkuh Rural District, in the Central District of Qaen County, South Khorasan Province, Iran. At the 2006 census, its population was 96, in 32 families.

References 

Populated places in Qaen County